Cyprus has an embassy in the Kuwait city, and Kuwait has an embassy in Nicosia. Cyprus was among the first countries to recognise the independence of Kuwait in 1961 and there have been expatriates of both sides, living and working in both countries.

Opening of the Kuwait embassy in Cyprus
With the opening of the Kuwait embassy in Nicosia, Cyprus, in 2011 President Demetris Christofias assured the ambassador of Kuwait that relations between the two countries will be further enhanced and that Cyprus has never forget the contribution Kuwait in the stability of the Cypriot economy during times of crisis in its history.

See also  
Foreign relations of Cyprus
Foreign relations of Kuwait

References

 
 
Kuwait
Bilateral relations of Kuwait